Phạm Xuân Ẩn (September 12, 1927 – September 20, 2006) was a Vietnamese journalist and correspondent for Time, Reuters and the New York Herald Tribune, stationed in Saigon during the war in Vietnam.  He was also simultaneously spying for the Viet Cong during the Vietnam War and was made a general of the People's Army of Vietnam after the war. His nicknames were Hai Trung and Tran Van Trung. He was awarded the title of People's Army Force Hero by the Vietnamese government on January 15, 1976. He was also put in a "softer" version of a re-education camp for a year after the war for being considered too close to the Americans.

Early life and education
He was born in Binh Truoc, Biên Hòa, Đồng Nai Province, but his parents were originally from Hải Dương Province. His grandfather was the headmaster of a school in Huế and was awarded the king of Vietnam's gold ring. Ẩn's father was a high-level engineer of the Public Administration Department. His family's service to France did not earn them French citizenship. Phạm was born in Biên Hòa Hospital with the help of French doctors.

When Ẩn was a child, he lived in Saigon. He had joined the Viet Minh in 1944 at the age of 16 to fight against the Japanese during World War II and afterward against the French.  When the August Revolution began against the French government, Ẩn left school and joined the Volunteer Youth Organisation. Later, he took classes offered by the Viet Minh. He then moved to Cần Thơ and studied at the College of Cần Thơ.

After the partition of Vietnam in 1954, Ẩn served in the southern Vietnamese National Army and was later awarded a scholarship to a college in California. In the late 1950s, Ẩn attended Orange Coast College (OCC) and earned an Associate of Arts degree. He wrote for the campus newspaper, then called The Barnacle.

Career
According to The Fall of Saigon by David Butler and Flashbacks by Morley Safer, Ẩn helped Tran Kim Tuyen, a South Vietnamese intelligence commander and CIA asset, escape Saigon on one of the last helicopters out of Saigon in 1975.

During the fall of Saigon evacuations, Ẩn obtained transport for his wife and four children to the United States provided by Time magazine. Shortly after the fall of Saigon, he was interrogated by the PAVN and put under house arrest to ensure he had no further contact with Westerners, and he was suspected of being "corrupted" by capitalism after decades of living in South Vietnam as a spy. He brought his family back to Saigon, later saying, "It was the stupidest thing I ever did." 

Ẩn died in Ho Chi Minh City in a military hospital from complications of emphysema.

In February 2009, The Spy Who Loved Us: The Vietnam War and Pham Xuan An's Dangerous Game  by Thomas A. Bass was published.

Safer interview of 1989
In 1989, Ẩn did an interview with Morley Safer, described in Safer's book Flashbacks. Ẩn said that in 1960, he joined Reuters and later Time, when he was made a colonel in the Viet Cong. He claimed to have passed information periodically through secret meetings in the Ho Bo Woods near Saigon during the Vietnam War and that only a handful of Viet Cong knew about his identity as a spy. Safer also writes that Ẩn was close with Charlie Mohr, Frank McCulloch, David Greenway, Richard Clurman, Bob Shaplen, Nguyen Hung Vuong and other noted journalists.

Safer called Ẩn a "dignified and decent man" but also noted the "enigma" and "layers" of the man. Safer also mentions Arnaud de Borchgrave's 1981 testimony before Senator Jeremiah Denton's subcommittee that Ẩn had a "mission" to "disinform the Western press". Ẩn denied the disinformation charge, claiming his superiors felt such tactics would have given him away. Safer and Ẩn also discuss Ẩn's year-long imprisonment in a re-education/lecture camp near Hanoi by the North Vietnamese after the end of the war because of his connection with Americans. Ẩn also described his opinion of the "paternalism and a discredited economy theory" being used by the Vietnamese leadership that had led to the failure of the revolution to help "the people."

See also

 The Sympathizer, a novel partly based on Phạm's life

References

External links
Pham Xuan An Dies at 79; Reporter Spied for Hanoi
Death of Vietnamese Super-Spy
Interview with biographer Larry Berman about An

Further reading
 
 
 
 
 
 

South Vietnamese spies for North Vietnam
Vietnamese communists
1927 births
2006 deaths
Deaths from emphysema
Orange Coast College alumni
People from Bien Hoa